"This Could Be the Night" is a song written by Paul Dean,  Mike Reno, Bill Wray and Jonathan Cain, and recorded by the Canadian rock band Loverboy from their hit album, Lovin' Every Minute of It, released in 1985. The song contained much more of a style that represented 1980s power pop ballads than the rocking style for which the band had been known. Released as a single in 1986 with an accompanying black-and-white music video, it reached the top ten on the Billboard Hot 100 singles chart.

Cash Box said that the "melodic, big-beat production features soaring guitars and string orchestration."  Billboard called it a "stately power ballad."

Charts

References

1980s ballads
1985 songs
1986 singles
Black-and-white music videos
Loverboy songs
Rock ballads
Song recordings produced by Bruce Fairbairn
Songs written by Bill Wray (composer)
Songs written by Jonathan Cain
Songs written by Mike Reno
Songs written by Paul Dean (guitarist)